Mehmet Ali Çınar (born 10 March 1949) is a Turkish football manager.

References

1949 births
Living people
Turkish football managers
Samsunspor managers
Fethiyespor managers
Kayserispor managers